Bitchin' is the seventh and final studio album by the American hard rock band The Donnas, released in 2007 on their own label Purple Feather and released through RedEye. It is their first album since leaving Atlantic Records. The record was produced by Jay Ruston (Polyphonic Spree, Metal Skool, Meat Loaf) and The Donnas. Two of the tracks, "Wasted" and "Here for the Party", were co-written with songwriter Holly Knight ("Love Is a Battlefield", "Obsession", "The Warrior").

The iTunes bonus track, "New Kid in School", is featured in the game Rock Band 2.

The album was made available on CD, a double-purple vinyl, and as a digital download.

Critical reception
''Bitchin was met with "mixed or average" reviews from critics. At Metacritic, which assigns a weighted average rating out of 100 to reviews from mainstream publications, this release received an average score of 54 based on 14 reviews.

In a review for AllMusic, critic reviewer Stephen Thomas Erlewine wrote: "The Donnas once rocked as if they were tanked to the gills but they now sound like they're playing with ferocious hangovers they just can't shake." At Billboard, Wes Orshoski noted the songs on the album are "too light on hooks" and "fail to balance irony, nasty shredding and big choruses." Evan Davies of Now said: "The foursome tend to write the same songs over and over again, this time thinly veiled in arena - and hair-metal swagger, but still too similar structurally to sound like they've challenged themselves." 

Writing for Pitchfork, David Raposa said the release "sounds like a half-hearted compromise between what the group was and what the group wants to become."

 Track listing 

 Singles 
 "Don't Wait Up For Me", released in August 2007.

 Charts 
{| class="wikitable plainrowheaders"
|+Chart performance for ''Bitchin
|-
! Chart (2007)
! Peakposition
|-

|-

|-

|}

Personnel 

Band members
 Brett Anderson – lead vocals
 Allison Robertson – guitar, backing vocals
 Maya Ford – bass, backing vocals
 Torry Castellano – drums, percussion, backing vocals

Additional musicians
 Holly Knight − vocals
 Joey Minkes – harmonica on "Here for the Party"

Production
 Jay Ruston – producer, engineer, mixing
 Bruce Witkin – engineer

References

External links
 
 

The Donnas albums
2007 albums